Jin Di may refer to:

Jin Di (translator)
Jin Di (actress)
Jin Di (sport shooter)